is a railway station in the city of Tōkai, Aichi Prefecture,  Japan, operated by Meitetsu.

Lines

Station layout
The station has two opposed side platforms connected by a footbridge. The station has automated ticket machines, Manaca automated turnstiles and is staffed.

Platforms

Adjacent stations

Station history
Minami Kagiya Station was opened on April 1, 1932 as a station on the Chita Railway. The Chita Railway became part of the Meitetsu group on February 2, 1943. A new station building was completed in 1983. In March 2007, the Tranpass system of magnetic fare cards with automatic turnstiles was implemented.

Passenger statistics
In fiscal 2017, the station was used by an average of 8244 passengers daily

Surrounding area
Kagaya Junior High School
Tokai Minami High School

See also
 List of Railway Stations in Japan

References

External links

 Official web page

Railway stations in Japan opened in 1932
Railway stations in Aichi Prefecture
Stations of Nagoya Railroad
Tōkai, Aichi